Daryl Duke (8 March 1929 – 21 October 2006) was a Canadian film and television director.

Biography
Duke was born at Vancouver, British Columbia, where he became one of CBC Television's earliest regional producers. His career continued with CBC in Toronto producing such series as This Hour Has Seven Days, then in the United States for major television networks and studios there.

In 1977, he won the Canadian Film Award for best Director for his surprise hit The Silent Partner.

His significant achievement in television was directing the Emmy Award winning miniseries The Thorn Birds. Duke was also among those responsible for the creation of CKVU-TV in Vancouver which is today part of the Citytv franchise.  Noteworthy is that he produced and directed early Bob Dylan "song films," black and white vignettes that were the forerunners of today's music videos. He was inducted to the BC Entertainment Hall of Fame and Star Walk in 1997.

Duke died in West Vancouver, British Columbia, in 2006 due to pulmonary fibrosis.

Filmography

Cinema
1972: Payday
1978: The Silent Partner
1982: Hard Feelings
1986: Tai-Pan

Television
1964: This Hour Has Seven Days
1966: Wojeck (1 episode)
1969: The Bold Ones: The New Doctors (3 episodes)
1970: Children of the Lotus Eater
1970: Night Gallery (1 episode)
1970–71: The Psychiatrist (pilot, 1 episode)
1972: Banacek (1 episode)
1972: Cool Million (episode)
1972: Ghost Story (2 episodes)
1973: I Heard the Owl Call My Name
1973: The President's Plane Is Missing
1974: Harry O (2-part episodes)
1975: A Cry for Help
1975: They Only Come Out at Night
1976: Griffin and Phoenix
1979: The Return of Charlie Chan
1983: The Thorn Birds (miniseries)
1985: Florence Nightingale
1989: When We Were Young
1990: Columbo: Columbo Cries Wolf
1991: Columbo: Caution: Murder Can Be Hazordous to Your Health
1992: Fatal Memories

Awards and recognition
1971: winner, Primetime Emmy Award, Outstanding Directorial Achievement in a Drama, episode of The Bold Ones: The Senator
2004: winner, John Drainie Award

References

External links
Daryl Duke official website
Northern Stars: Daryl Duke

boppin.com
Records of Daryl Duke are held by Simon Fraser University's Special Collections and Rare Books

1929 births
2006 deaths
Canadian television directors
Deaths from pulmonary fibrosis
Film directors from Vancouver
Best Director Genie and Canadian Screen Award winners